Pseudischnochiton is an extinct genus of polyplacophoran molluscs. Pseudischnochiton became extinct during the Miocene period.

References 

Prehistoric chiton genera